Bampura is a genus of bristle flies in the family Tachinidae.

Species
Bampura angustigena Tschorsnig, 1983
Bampura breviaristata Gilasian & Ziegler, 2019
Bampura nudicosta (Mesnil, 1970)

References

Exoristinae
Diptera of Asia
Tachinidae genera